Étienne Le Rallic (1891–1968) was a French illustrator and comics artist.

References

French cartoonists
1891 births
1968 deaths